Matthew Joseph Shepherd (born February 21, 1976) is an attorney from his native El Dorado, Arkansas, who is a Republican member of the Arkansas House of Representatives for District 6, which includes western Union County. He was elected in the 2010, 2012, and 2014 legislative races.

Upon the resignation of Speaker Jeremy Gillam in June 2018, he was elected Speaker of the Arkansas House of Representatives for the 91st General Assembly. He was re-elected in January 2019 to serve as Speaker of the 92nd General Assembly.

In May 2020, Arkansas House members elected him as Speaker-designate for the 93rd General Assembly.

In 2010, Shepherd claimed the District 6 seat by defeating Democrat Ken Bridges, 4,780 to 2,074. In 2012, still in the reorganized District 6, Shepherd won a second term, defeating Independent Peter Cyphers, 10,051 to 2,149.

Biography 
Shepherd graduated in 1998 from the Southern Baptist-affiliated Ouachita Baptist University in Arkadelphia in South Arkansas. In 2001, he received the Juris Doctor degree from the University of Arkansas School of Law at Fayetteville. Shepherd is a practising attorney at El Dorado-based law firm Shepherd and Shepherd.

Personal life 
Shepherd is married and has three children.

See also 
 List of speakers of the Arkansas House of Representatives

References 

|-

1976 births
21st-century American politicians
Arkansas lawyers
Baptists from Arkansas
Living people
Ouachita Baptist University alumni
People from El Dorado, Arkansas
Speakers of the Arkansas House of Representatives
Republican Party members of the Arkansas House of Representatives
University of Arkansas School of Law alumni